John Adam Lesner (June 26, 1868 – July 5, 1938) was an American Democratic politician who served twice as a member of the Senate of Virginia, from 1908 to 1916 and from 1923 until his death in 1938.

The Lesner Bridge in Virginia Beach, Virginia is named after him.

References

External links
 
 

1868 births
1938 deaths
Democratic Party Virginia state senators
Politicians from Norfolk, Virginia
20th-century American politicians